Wade Mark (born November 18 1953) is a Trinidadian and Tobagonian politician and a member of the Senate of Trinidad and Tobago. He served as the Speaker of the House from 2010 to 2015. He obtained his bachelor's degree in 1979 in economics and politics from the University of the West Indies in Saint Augustine.

Early life and career

References

1953 births
Living people
United National Congress politicians
Members of the House of Representatives (Trinidad and Tobago)